The Alfred Saxons are composed of 21 teams representing Alfred University in intercollegiate athletics, including men and women's alpine skiing, basketball, cross country, equestrian, lacrosse, soccer, swimming & diving, tennis, and track and field. Men's sports include football. Women's sports include softball and volleyball. The Saxons compete in the NCAA Division III and are members of the Empire 8 for all sports except for alpine skiing, which is governed by the USCSA, and the equestrian team, which is governed by the IHSA.

Teams

Baseball
Alfred has had 5 Major League Baseball Draft selections since the draft began in 1965.

References

External links